Torre Caney is the second tallest building in Santo Domingo and the Dominican Republic. It was the tallest building in the Dominican Republic until completion of the residential tower Anacaona 27. It is located along the Anacaona Avenue, an area of increasing development in Santo Domingo which hosts many of the tallest buildings in the country and the Caribbean.

Construction

Construction started in 2005 and was completed in 2008 by the Rodriguez Sandoval firm,  which has completed numerous projects including other Dominican skyscrapers such as Aquabella, Torre Carib, Torre Pedro Enrique Ureña, and the famous Malecon Center.

Interior

The building includes a three story lobby, indoor parking and a gymnasium. The roof accommodates a heliport and a swimming pool. Each single floor apartment has  of space, of which there are 31.

References

Residential buildings in the Dominican Republic
Residential buildings completed in 2008
Buildings and structures in Santo Domingo
Residential skyscrapers
Skyscrapers in the Dominican Republic